The yellow-rumped marshbird (Pseudoleistes guirahuro) is a species of bird in the family Icteridae. It is a medium-sized bird found in Argentina, Brazil, Paraguay, and Uruguay, where its natural habitats are dry savanna, swamps, and pastureland.

Description
The yellow-rumped marshbird is named for its yellow belly, flanks, thighs, and rump. Its head is blackish in color; its breast, back, and wings are blackish brown. The species exhibits slight size dimorphism, with males weighing on average 91.2 g and females weighing on average 81.9 g.

Distribution and habitat
The yellow-rumped marshbird is found in southeastern Brazil, eastern Paraguay, northern Uruguay, and the Misiones and Corrientes provinces of northeastern Argentina. Its range in Brazil overlaps with that of the brown-and-yellow marshbird. It is most commonly found in shrubby marsh or moist grasslands and avoids treeless habitats.

Ecology
The yellow-rumped marshbird feeds on ground arthropods and small vertebrates. Marshbirds are gregarious and form flocks of 10-20 birds for most of the year. From September through November, single marshbird pairs can be observed, indicating the beginning of the breeding cycle. One individual will gather nest materials, inspect nest sites, and build the nest, while the other produces short songs. After eggs are laid, three to four adult marshbirds can be observed to guard the nest and bring food to chicks, indicating that yellow-rumped marshbirds are regular cooperative breeders.

References

External links
Yellow-rumped marshbird videos

yellow-rumped marshbird
Birds of Argentina
Birds of Brazil
Birds of Paraguay
Birds of Uruguay
Birds of the Pantanal
yellow-rumped marshbird
Taxa named by Louis Jean Pierre Vieillot
Taxonomy articles created by Polbot